Meiring is a surname. Notable people with the surname include:

Alton Meiring (born 1976), South African football player
Georg Meiring (born 1939), South African military commander
Lin Meiring (born 1933), South African swimmer
Piet Meiring, South African theologian
Sheila Meiring Fugard (born 1932), British-born South African short story writer
Steven Meiring (born 1984), South African rugby union player

See also
Meyrink

Afrikaans-language surnames